Fridrihs Ukstiņš (15 November 1895 – May 1972) was a Latvian cyclist. He competed at the 1924 Summer Olympics and the 1928 Summer Olympics.

References

External links
 

1895 births
1972 deaths
Latvian male cyclists
Olympic cyclists of Latvia
Cyclists at the 1924 Summer Olympics
Cyclists at the 1928 Summer Olympics